Sir Richard John Broadbent  (born 22 April 1953) is a British businessman.

Early life
Born in 1953, he studied at Queen Mary, University of London, and completed an MA at Manchester University.

Career
Broadbent joined HM Treasury in 1975. He spent ten years at the Treasury, including periods as Private Secretary to both Labour and Conservative Party ministers.  He took up a Harkness Fellowship at Stanford Business School in the United States in 1983 before joining Schroders investment bank in London in 1986.

In 1995, he was appointed head of Schroder's European corporate finance business. In this role he led the development of Schroders UK and continental European investment banking business.  In 1998, he was appointed global head of Corporate Finance and a member of the Group Executive Committee.  He was based in New York until mid-1999 when he left Schroders prior to their sale to Citigroup.

He was appointed Executive Chairman of Her Majesty's Customs and Excise in February 2000 until July 2003 prior to its merger with HM Inland Revenue.  During this time, he was responsible for a programme of change management in tax and law enforcement.  He was also a member of the Civil Service Management Board.

He was appointed to the board of Barclays plc in September 2003, becoming Senior Independent Director in September 2004.  He chaired the Board Risk Committee from 2006 to 2010 and was appointed Deputy chairman in 2010.  He retired from the Board of Barclays in 2011.

In July 2004, he was appointed to the board of Arriva, a European passenger transport business, taking over as non-executive chairman in November 2004. He stepped down from the Board of Arriva in August 2010, when the company was sold to Deutsche Bahn.

He was appointed to the board of Tesco plc in July 2011 and took over as chairman in December 2011; he stood down in October 2014 following reports of accounting errors. He is chairman of the advisory board and a member of the executive committee of the Dawes Centre for Future Crime at University College, London.

He is the author of three books: "Choosing Life"; "Know Thyself"; and "The Spirit of Compassionate Communication".

Memberships
Broadbent is a member and a former non-executive director of The Security Institute.  He was knighted in the 2003 Birthday Honours. He is member of the Council of Relate, the relationship charity and Chairman of the GSB Trust.

Personal life
He lives in Norfolk with his wife, Jill.

References

1953 births
Living people
Knights Commander of the Order of the Bath
British chairpersons of corporations
Alumni of Queen Mary University of London
Alumni of the University of Manchester
Chairmen of Tesco
Barclays people
Tesco people
Schroders people